is a Japanese dancer, actor and director. He is member and former performer of J-Pop group Exile. He was part of the first generation J Soul Brothers. Since 2016 he has been serving as the chairman of the Gekidan Exile Matsu-gumi.

Matsumoto is represented with LDH.

Participating groups

Personal life 
On July 22, 2013, Matsu announced his engagement to a non-celebrity woman after 7 years of dating. The couple registered their marriage on January 1, 2014.

On April 21, 2016, it was announced that the couple had welcomed their first child, a boy.

Filmography

※His roles in bold are his leading roles

Stage

Films

TV dramas

Internet drama

TV programmes

Advertisements

Radio

Voice acting

Music videos

Bibliography

Books

Lyrics

Productions

CD jackets

DVD

Directorial theatre works

Films

References

External links
 at Exile Official Website 
 

Japanese male dancers
Japanese male actors
People from Kawasaki, Kanagawa
1975 births
Living people
LDH (company) artists